Robby Stein is Director of Product at Instagram. Previously he used to work for Google and was co-founder and CEO of Stamped, Marissa Mayer's first acquisition as CEO of Yahoo.

References

Living people
American businesspeople
Google employees
Yahoo! employees
Year of birth missing (living people)